Sibi Airport  is a domestic airport located at Sibi, a city in the Balochistan province of Pakistan.

History 
Pakistan International Airlines operated flights to the airport in the late eighties using the Fokker F-27 from Karachi. However the route was dropped in the early nineties.

Structure 
A Civil Aviation Authority tender was issued on March 9, 2009, requiring the runway of the airport to be repaired.

See also 
 List of airports in Pakistan
 Airlines of Pakistan
 Transport in Pakistan
 Pakistan Civil Aviation Authority

References

External links 
 
 

Airports in Balochistan, Pakistan